Rampura is a village located in the Nagaur district of Rajasthan state, India.

The native language of Rampura is Hindi and Marwari language is also used. The nearest railway station in and around Rampura is Narayanpura, Kuchaman. The nearest airport to Rampura is at Jaipur.

General information

 Religion: 100% of population are Hindus
 Geographical Location: 15 km from Kuchaman City
 Temperature: Max. 44 °C in June, Min. 1 °C in January
 Monsoon Season: June to July
 Annual Rainfall: 418 mm

References

Villages in Nagaur district